Jonathan Richard Cockcroft (born 28 May 1977) is an English former first-class cricketer.

Cockcroft was born in Bradford in May 1977. He later studied at Oriel College at the University of Oxford. While studying at Oxford, he played first-class cricket for Oxford University in 1997 and 1998, making three appearances against Essex, Sussex and Hampshire. He scored a total of 19 runs in these matches, in addition to bowling 20 wicket-less overs with his leg break bowling. Cockcroft is currently employed as Commercial Director of England Hockey.

References

External links

1977 births
Living people
Cricketers from Bradford
Alumni of Oriel College, Oxford
English cricketers
Oxford University cricketers